DOF Subsea is an international subsea operating company. The company provides integrated project managed and engineered subsea solutions to the global offshore oil and gas industry. The company offers services to oil and gas producing regions around the world. Assets include 26 offshore vessels, 52 Remotely operated vehicles, 2 Autonomous underwater vehicle and 11 diving spreads. The company also have 70 ROVs. The company has been operating since the 1980s. Supplied subsea services include seabed mapping, survey, repair and maintenance of subsea structures, construction support and engineering. DOF Subsea operates in over 10 countries across the world.

History and acquisition 
In 2008, DOF ASA and First Reserve Corporation, an energy-focused private equity firm, entered into an agreement whereby DOF ASA, subject to the certain conditions being satisfied, would put forward an offer to acquire all of the outstanding shares of DOF Subsea at NOK 39.00 per share in cash. 

As part of the agreement, DOF and First Reserve had also agreed to enter into several subsequent transactions if the offer was successful and certain conditions were satisfied. If the offer was successful, DOF would proceed with a compulsory acquisition of the remaining outstanding shares in DOF Subsea and delist DOF Subsea. 

Following the acquisition of the remaining shares in DOF Subsea (including the compulsory acquisition), DOF would transfer 100% of the shares in DOF Subsea to a newly incorporated private holding company (HoldCo), which would then be owned 51% by DOF and 49% by First Reserve.

See also
List of oilfield service companies

Business services companies of Norway
Shipping companies of Norway
Engineering companies of Norway
Companies based in Bergen
Year of establishment missing